Cryosophila grayumii is a species of flowering plant in the family Arecaceae. It is found only in Costa Rica. It is threatened by habitat loss.

References

grayumii
Flora of Costa Rica
Critically endangered plants
Taxonomy articles created by Polbot